"Bubba Hyde" is a song written by Gene Nelson and Craig Wiseman, and recorded by American country music group Diamond Rio. It was released in February 1995 as the third single from the group's 1994 album Love a Little Stronger. The song reached No. 16 on the Billboard Hot Country Singles & Tracks chart.

Content
The song is about a mild-mannered grocery store employee, Barney Jekyll, who, on Friday nights, puts on leather boots and an "Elvis jacket" and drives a sports car to a honky-tonk, where he goes by the name of "Bubba Hyde". The song is a reference to the 1886 novella Strange Case of Dr Jekyll and Mr Hyde by Robert Louis Stevenson.

Music video
The music video was directed by Deaton-Flanigen Productions and premiered in January 1995. It stars Jm J. Bullock, best-known for playing Monroe on the sitcom Too Close for Comfort and Prince Valium in Spaceballs, as Barney Jekyll/Bubba Hyde.

Chart performance

References

1994 songs
1995 singles
Diamond Rio songs
Songs written by Craig Wiseman
Songs written by Gene Nelson (songwriter)
Music videos directed by Deaton-Flanigen Productions
Arista Nashville singles
Works based on Strange Case of Dr Jekyll and Mr Hyde